Karl-Erik Johansson (10 February 1924 – 26 August 1987) was a Finnish rower. He competed in the men's coxed four event at the 1952 Summer Olympics.

References

External links
 

1924 births
1987 deaths
Finnish male rowers
Olympic rowers of Finland
Rowers at the 1952 Summer Olympics
Sportspeople from Uusimaa